A tricarboxylic acid is an organic carboxylic acid whose chemical structure contains three carboxyl functional groups (-COOH). The best-known example of a tricarboxylic acid is citric acid.

Uses

Citric acid cycle

Citric acid, a type of tricarboxylic acid, is used in the citric acid cycle – also known as tricarboxylic acid (TCA) cycle or Krebs cycle – which is fundamental to all aerobic organisms.

Examples

See also
 Citric acid cycle (tricarboxylic acid cycle)
 Dicarboxylic acid
 Mellitic acid

Literature